The E. E. Wilson Wildlife Area (or E. E. Wilson Game Management Area) is a wildlife management area located near Corvallis, Oregon. The site was named for Eddy Elbridge Wilson, a member of the former Oregon State Game Commission for fourteen years before his death in 1961. Wildlife visible includes blacktail deer, pheasant, and quail.

The area occupies a section of Camp Adair, a decommissioned United States Army cantonment which operated during World War II.

References

External links

Protected areas of Benton County, Oregon
Protected areas established in 1950
Oregon state wildlife areas
1950 establishments in Oregon